Steven Universe: Unleash the Light is an action-adventure game based on, and taking place after, the Steven Universe animated series. The game is the third and final game in the Light trilogy, after Attack the Light and Save the Light. The game was developed by Grumpyface Studios and published by Cartoon Network Games. The storyline was written by Rebecca Sugar and features voices by the shows original cast.

The game was initially only released on iOS in November 2019 as part of the Apple Arcade launch. Just over a year later, in February 2021, the game was simultaneously released on PC, Xbox One, PlayStation 4, and Nintendo Switch.

Gameplay 

Taking place after the conclusion of the television show, the game starts with Steven finding out that there are two more light prisms following the events of Save The Light.

The game follows the classic RPG format, with the player levelling up their characters through fighting enemies in various areas that act like dungeons. Battling is strategic, with turn-taking and a limited amount of attacks per turn. Each character has their own unique moves, with many of Steven's being healing-based.

The player may only bring four characters with them at a time. Steven is always in the party, and the player can choose to add Garnet, Pearl, Amethyst, Lapis Lazuli, Bismuth, Peridot, Connie, or Greg. During battle, some characters have the ability to fuse. Unlike in the previous games, players have the option to unlock alternate costumes for the characters.

Reception 
The iOS version of the game was praised by critics. It received 5 stars on TouchArcade, which described it as an "Apple Arcade gem", while Game Informer called it "a diamond in the rough among movie/television-to-videogame adaptions." George Foster of RPGSite commented that while fans of the show will appreciate the game the most, with gameplay that "will be enough on its own" for non-fans and praised the character interactions as having improved since Save The Light. Mike Fahey of Kotaku stated that he appreciated the simplicity of the game, comparing it to Paper Mario in its game mechanics, and saying that it never felt bloated.

References 

2019 video games
Action-adventure games
IOS games
Android (operating system) games
Role-playing video games
Video games developed in the United States
Video games based on Steven Universe
Nintendo Switch games
Xbox One games
PlayStation 4 games
Cartoon Network video games